Thomas Welbourne (Welbourn) (born Hutton Buscel, North Riding of Yorkshire - executed at York, 1 August 1605) was an English Roman Catholic teacher. He is a Catholic martyr, beatified in 1929.

Life

All that is known about Welbourne comes from details collected by Richard Challoner, in early Catholic catalogues of martyrs:

Thomas Welbourne was a school-master, a native of Kitenbushel in Yorkshire; and John Fulthering was a layman of the same county, who being zealous Catholics, and industrious in exhorting some of their neighbours to embrace the Catholic faith, were upon that account arraigned and condemned to suffer as in cases of high treason (II, 12).

Fellow Yorkshireman, Ven John Fulthering, was executed with Thomas Welbourne.

Neither name occurs in Peacock's Yorkshire Catholics in 1604.

References

Richard Challoner, Memoirs of Missionary Priests (London, 1741–42); 
Wilson, Martyrologe (s.l., 1608); 
Worthington, Catalogues'' (1608 and 1614)

Notes

References

Attribution

1605 deaths
English beatified people
17th-century venerated Christians
Year of birth unknown
16th-century births
16th-century English educators
17th-century English educators
17th-century Roman Catholic martyrs
16th-century Roman Catholics
One Hundred and Seven Martyrs of England and Wales